The collared jays are two species of South American jays that used to be considered conspecific:

 Black-collared jay (Cyanolyca armillata) – Ecuador, Colombia and Venezuela.
 White-collared jay (Cyanolyca viridicyanus) – Bolivia and Peru.